is a farm in Nakafurano, Hokkaido, Japan.

Farm Tomita is one of the many farms in the area which create this reputation by planting giant fields of lavender and other colorful crops such as tulips. Right, is a picture of one of the many scenic vistas available to tourists who visit the farm. The farm also sells many products based on the lavender it produces, from lavender scented candles and soap to lavender flavored drinks and ice cream.

External links

 

Tourist attractions in Hokkaido
Farms in Japan
Lavandula